State Highway 6 (SH 6) is a State Highway in Kerala, India that starts in Kayamkulam and ends in Thiruvalla.

Route description 
Kayamkulam Town - Chettikulangara Devi Temple - Mavelikkara junction - Chennithala  - Mannar  - Parumala  - Travancore Sugars & Chemicals - Manipuzha bridge - Thiruvalla Town (joining (SH - 07))

See also 
Roads in Kerala
List of State Highways in Kerala

References 

State Highways in Kerala
Roads in Alappuzha district
Roads in Pathanamthitta district